The Thompson shell was the first Unix shell, introduced in the first version of Unix in 1971, and was written by Ken Thompson.
It was a simple command interpreter, not designed for scripting, but nonetheless introduced several innovative features to the command-line interface and led to the development of the later Unix shells.

History
The name "shell" for a command-line interpreter and the concept of making the shell a user program outside of the operating system kernel were introduced in Unix's precursor Multics.

An early feature of the Thompson shell was a compact syntax for input/output redirection.  In Multics, redirecting the  input or output of a command required separate commands to start and stop redirection; in Unix, one could simply add an argument to the command line consisting of the < symbol followed by a filename for input or the > symbol for output, and the shell would redirect I/O for the duration of the command.  This syntax was already present by the release of the first version of Unix in 1971.

A later addition was the concept of pipes.  At the suggestion of Douglas McIlroy, the redirection syntax was expanded so that the output of one command could be passed to the input of another command.  The original pipe syntax, as described in the Version 3 manual, was:

 command1 >command2>

This syntax proved too ambiguous and was easily confused with redirection to and from files—the system cannot tell if "command2" is the command "command2" or the file "command2". By Version 4, the syntax had changed to use both the | and ^ symbols to denote pipes:

 command1 | command2

This produces exactly the same result as:

 command1 ^ command2

The > symbol changed into:

 command1 > file1

This would put the output of command1 into file1.

The Thompson shell syntax for redirection with < and >, and piping with |, has proven durable and has been adopted by most other Unix shells and command shells of several other operating systems, most notably on DOS, OS/2 and Microsoft Windows.

Decline and replacements
The shell's design was intentionally minimalistic; even the if and goto statements, essential for control of program flow, were implemented as separate commands.
As a result, by the 1975 release of Version 6 Unix, it was becoming clear that the Thompson shell was inadequate for most serious programming tasks.

At this time, the developers of the Programmer's Workbench UNIX distribution, most notably John Mashey, began modifying the Thompson shell to make it more suitable for programming.
The result, known as the PWB shell or the Mashey shell, included more advanced flow-control mechanisms and introduced shell variables, but remained limited by the necessity to remain compatible with the Thompson shell.

Finally, the Thompson shell was replaced as the main Unix shell by the Bourne shell in Version 7 Unix and the C shell in 2BSD, both released in 1979. Since virtually all modern Unix and Unix-like systems are descended from V7 and 2BSD, the Thompson shell is generally no longer used. It is, however, available as open-source as part of several Ancient Unix source distributions, and has been ported to modern Unices as a historical exhibit.

See also
 Comparison of command shells

References

External links
Manual page for the Thompson shell in Unix 1st Edition.
The Evolution of the Unix Time-Sharing System - describes the early development of the shell
Origins of the Bourne shell - manual pages for the 3rd, 4th, and 6th edition Thompson shells, and other resources on the early shells
Sixth Edition Thompson Shell Port - the Thompson shell and its associated utilities ported to modern Unix systems

Unix shells